Valladares (or  Valadares in Portuguese and Galician) is a notable family name originating in the ancient land of Valadares, situated next to Melgaço. It is the northernmost municipality in Portugal, on the south bank of the Minho River, which separates Portugal and Galicia. Because of the proximity of northern Portugal and Galicia, the early Valadares can be found on both sides of the border. The first titled member of the Valladares nobility in Galicia was Luis Sarmiento de Valladares, the first viscount of Meira in 1669 and first marquis de Valladares 1673, the latter title granted by King Charles II of Spain in the second half of the 17th-century. The Valladares family are also very popular in Central America specifically in Honduras, El Salvador, Mexico and in Brazil as well (although the surname is Valadares in Portuguese).

Valladares nobility of Galicia
The Valladares family originated in the ancient kingdom of Spain in the northwestern province of Galicia, and the northernmost municipality of Portugal, and so we can find members of the Valladares family on both sides of the Minho river that divides Spain & Portugal. The family was able to establish themselves in other regions of Spain and become influential members of their communities. 

One of the earliest Valadares recorded was the nobleman Soeiro Aires de Valadares, son of Arias Núñez de Valadares and Ximena Núñez, both from Galicia.  Soeiro was a member of the curia regis of King Alfonso Henriques and appears in royal charters from 1169 to 1179.  Soeiro's first wife was Elvira Nunes Velho. He later married Maria Alfonso, an illegitimate daughter of King Alfonso IX of León and his mistress Teresa Gil de Soverosa, who had first married Álvaro Fernández de Lara, and later the concubine of her nephew King Alfonso X of Castile, and then married her second husband Suero Arias de Valladares.  Also a member of this family was Aldonça Lourenço de Valadares, the mother of Ines de Castro.

The Valladares noble families aided the Catholic Monarchs of Spain in 1492, in the Reconquista in which Christian troops under orders of King Ferdinand and Queen Isabella reconquered Spain and expelled the invading Muslims in the year 1492. They were granted nobility by the Order of Santiago in 1624, and by the Order of Alcantara in 1659. The first titled member of the Valladares nobility in Galicia was Luis Sarmiento de Valladares, the first viscount of Meira in 1669 and first marquis de Valladares 1673, the latter title granted by King Charles II of Spain in the second half of the 17th-century.

Early notables among prominent bearers of the family name in this era was Antonio Gaspar Valladares, Maria Tomasa Valladares and Ana Jacoba Valladares Sarmiento, who were listed in the records of the noble Order of Carlos III. José Sarmiento de Valladares y Arines-Troncoso Romay, 1st Duke of Atrisco, Grandee of Spain, jure uxoris Count of Moctezuma (1643-1708) was viceroy of New Spain( meaning Mexico, Central America and the southern part of the USA) from December 18, 1696, to November 3, 1701. Diego Sarmiento de Valladares (1615-1695) was a Spanish bishop who was Grand Inquisitor of Spain from 1669 to 1695.

References

Bibliography 

 

Galician-language surnames